The Central Region was a region that competed in the Little League World Series between  and .

The region consisted of teams from the Dakotas, Illinois, Indiana, Iowa, Kansas, Michigan, Minnesota, Missouri, Nebraska, Oklahoma, Ohio, and Wisconsin. In 2000, Kentucky replaced Oklahoma in the region.

Little League Baseball expanded the LLWS to sixteen teams for the 2001 Little League World Series.  The Central Region was split into the Midwest Region (the Dakotas, Iowa, Kansas, Minnesota, Missouri, and Nebraska) and the Great Lakes Region (Illinois, Indiana, Kentucky, Michigan, Ohio, and Wisconsin).

Regional Champions (1957-2000)

The following table indicates the Central Region champion and its LLWS performance in each year between 1957 and 2000.

Results by State

See also
Little League World Series (Great Lakes Region)
Little League World Series (Midwest Region)

References

External links
Little League Online
Central Region Historical Results

Central
Defunct baseball competitions in the United States
Sports in the Midwestern United States